Komaali Kings is a 2018 Sri Lankan Tamil language black comedy thriller film written and directed by King Ratnam in his directorial debut and co-produced by Ganesh Deivanayagam, Bawadharani Rajasingham and R. Selvaskandan for Picture This Motions. The film, starring Raja Ganeshan, Kamala Sri Mohan, Darshan Dharmaraj, Gajan Kanesshan, Niranjani Shanmugaraja, Sathiyapriya Ratnasaamy along with King Ratnam in the lead roles, opened to positive reviews among the audience after the first day. The film also received praise from the critics for its satire and comedy storyline.

Komaali Kings is considered one of the rarest and most important mass-budgeted films in Sri Lankan Tamil cinema in nearly about 40 years since the release of super hit Komaligal in 1976. Komaali Kings was one of the most awaited films in Sri Lankan cinema after its production was started back in 2016 with only 26 days of shooting procedure but there were delays due to unavoidable factors, and was finally released nationwide on 23 February 2018 after 2 years of delays. The film has both Sinhala and English subtitles.

Recently this film won Best Tamil film of the year award from Derana Film Awards 2019.

Production 
A team announced the filming process about a Tamil movie to be produced in Sri Lanka titled as "Komaali Kings" earlier in the year 2016, on 23 January. The team stated that Komaali Kings was an attempt to rekindle and re-establish nostalgic memories of the hay days of Sri Lankan Tamil Cinema mainly as the Sri Lankan Tamil cinema was demolished due to the Sri Lankan civil war which prevailed in Sri Lanka for 30 years. Initially, the director of the film wanted to prepare a script on a crime thriller film with the title, Nuni before changing his mindset to arrange script for a black comedy film. The trailer of the film was released in 2016 and the first look poster of the film was released by popular Indian director, K. S. Ravikumar. Veteran Sri Lankan radio announcer and the actor who starred in the film Komaligal, B. H. Abdul Hameed served as the honourable patron of this landmark film.

The film had shot in Tamil resident areas of Sri Lanka such as Jaffna, Batticaloa, Malayagam, and Colombo as the film includes the usage of 6 different slangs of Tamil language which exists in the nation. The movie also comprises the mixture of Tamil, Sinhala, Muslim and Christianity cultures to indicate the unity between races in the nation.

Plot 
The film's title is inspired from the Sri Lankan box office hit 1976 Tamil film Komaligal. The theme of the movie is Simple, but a master plan.

"Komaali Kings" revolves around Siva Sithambaram (Raja Ganesan), an average next-door neighbour whose mundane life takes a hilarious turn when a distant relative Pat (King Ratnam) and his family from London decide to stay with him for the duration of their trip to attend a family wedding.

Cast 
The cast includes the Tamil language speaking Sinhala film lead actor, Darshan Dharmaraj and lead actress, Niranjani Shanmugaraja along with director, King Ratnam playing an important role as the character of 'Pat'. More importantly, the film consists of all-Sri Lankan crew with most of them making their acting debuts.
 Darshan Dharmaraj as Mohan  
 Niranjani Shanmugaraja as Yoga  
 King Ratnam as Pat  
 Raja Ganesan as Siva Sithambaram  
 Gajan Kanesshan as Babeth Baba 
 David as Groom  
 Kamalasiri Mohan Kumar as Mrs. Siva  
 Nekita Reshani as Baba's girlfriend 
 Adri Abilash as Angelo  
 Enoch Akshay as Agilan  
 Anushyanthan as Kutty  
 Kamalraj Balakrishnan as Roshan 
 Meena Deivanayagam as Vaishoo 
 Navayuga Rajkumar as Mohan's wife 
 Priya Luvendran as news anchor  
 Priyantha Srikumara as Baba's driver 
 Daya Wayaman as van driver 
 Goabi Ramanan as Swamiji 
 Pathurjan Wijesekara as Swamiji assistant

Soundtrack
The songs and background score for this film has been composed by Shriraam Sachi in his debut as a music director. This is a debut film for the singers as well.

Release 
The film was initially released in theatres in Feb 23, 2018. later it was also made available in a streaming site named Ceynema.lk

References

External links 
 
 Komaali Kings on YouTube
 Komaali Kings on Facebook
 රජවෙන්නට පෙරුම් පුරන කෝමාලි කිංග්ස්
 'Komaali Kings': 40-year revival of Sri Lankan Tamil cinema?
 කෝමාලි kings තැනූ king රත්නම්

Sri Lankan Tamil-language films
2018 directorial debut films
2018 black comedy films
2018 thriller films